Dystonia is a neurological hyperkinetic movement disorder  in which sustained or repetitive muscle contractions result in twisting and repetitive movements or abnormal fixed postures. The movements may resemble a tremor. Dystonia is often intensified or exacerbated by physical activity, and symptoms may progress into adjacent muscles.

The disorder may be hereditary or caused by other factors such as birth-related or other physical trauma, infection, poisoning (e.g., lead poisoning) or reaction to pharmaceutical drugs, particularly neuroleptics, or stress. Treatment must be highly customized to the needs of the individual and may include oral medications, chemodenervation botulinum neurotoxin injections, physical therapy, or other supportive therapies, and surgical procedures such as deep brain stimulation.

Classification
There are multiple types of dystonia, and many diseases and conditions may cause dystonia.

Dystonia is classified by:
 Clinical characteristics such as age of onset, body distribution, nature of the symptoms, and associated features such as additional movement disorders or neurological symptoms, and
 Cause (which includes changes or damage to the nervous system and inheritance).
Physicians use these classifications to guide diagnosis and treatment.

Types
 Generalized
 Focal
 Segmental
 Psychogenic
 Acute dystonic reaction
 Vegetative-vascular

Generalized dystonias
For example, dystonia musculorum deformans (Oppenheim, Flatau-Sterling syndrome):

 Normal birth history and milestones
 Autosomal dominant
 Childhood onset
 Starts in lower limbs and spreads upwards

Also known as torsion dystonia or idiopathic torsion dystonia (old terminology "dystonia musculorum deformans").

Focal dystonias

These most common dystonias are typically classified as follows:

The combination of blepharospasmodic contractions and oromandibular dystonia is called cranial dystonia or Meige's syndrome.

Segmental dystonias
Segmental dystonias affect two adjoining parts of the body:
 Hemidystonia affects an arm and foot on one side of the body.
 Multifocal dystonia affects many different parts of the body.
 Generalized dystonia affects most of the body, frequently involving the legs and back.

Genetic/primary

There is a group called myoclonic dystonia where some cases are hereditary and have been associated with a missense mutation in the dopamine-D2 receptor. Some of these cases have responded well to alcohol.

Other genes that have been associated with dystonia include CIZ1, GNAL, ATP1A3, and PRRT2. Another report has linked THAP1 and SLC20A2 to dystonia.

Signs and symptoms

Symptoms vary according to the kind of dystonia involved. In most cases, dystonia tends to lead to abnormal posturing, in particular on movement. Many individuals with the condition have continuous pain, cramping, and relentless muscle spasms due to involuntary muscle movements.  Other motor symptoms are possible including lip smacking.

Early symptoms may include loss of precision muscle coordination (sometimes first manifested in declining penmanship, frequent small injuries to the hands, and dropped items), cramping pain with sustained use, and trembling. Significant muscle pain and cramping may result from very minor exertions like holding a book and turning pages. It may become difficult to find a comfortable position for arms and legs with even the minor exertions associated with holding arms crossed causing significant pain similar to restless leg syndrome. Affected persons may notice trembling in the diaphragm while breathing, or the need to place hands in pockets, under legs while sitting or under pillows while sleeping to keep them still and to reduce pain. Trembling in the jaw may be felt and heard while lying down, and the constant movement to avoid pain may result in the grinding and wearing down of teeth, or symptoms similar to temporomandibular joint disorder. The voice may crack frequently or become harsh, triggering frequent throat clearing. Swallowing can become difficult and accompanied by painful cramping.

Electrical sensors (EMG) inserted into affected muscle groups, while painful, can provide a definitive diagnosis by showing pulsating nerve signals being transmitted to the muscles even when they are at rest. The brain appears to signal portions of fibers within the affected muscle groups at a firing speed of about 10 Hz causing them to pulsate, tremble and contort. When called upon to perform an intentional activity, the muscles fatigue very quickly and some portions of the muscle groups do not respond (causing weakness) while other portions over-respond or become rigid (causing micro-tears under load). The symptoms worsen significantly with use, especially in the case of focal dystonia, and a "mirror effect" is often observed in other body parts: Use of the right hand may cause pain and cramping in that hand as well as in the other hand and legs that were not being used. Stress, anxiety, lack of sleep, sustained use and cold temperatures can worsen symptoms.

Direct symptoms may be accompanied by secondary effects of the continuous muscle and brain activity, including disturbed sleep patterns, exhaustion, mood swings, mental stress, difficulty concentrating, blurred vision, digestive problems, and short temper. People with dystonia may also become depressed and find great difficulty adapting their activities and livelihood to a progressing disability. Side-effects from treatment and medications can also present challenges in normal activities.

In some cases, symptoms may progress and then plateau for years, or stop progressing entirely. The progression may be delayed by treatment or adaptive lifestyle changes, while forced continued use may make symptoms progress more rapidly. In others, the symptoms may progress to total disability, making some of the more risky forms of treatment worth considering. In some cases with patients who already have dystonia, a subsequent traumatic injury or the effects of general anesthesia during an unrelated surgery can cause the symptoms to progress rapidly.

An accurate diagnosis may be difficult because of the way the disorder manifests itself. Affected individuals may be diagnosed as having similar and perhaps related disorders including Parkinson's disease, essential tremor, carpal tunnel syndrome, temporomandibular joint disorder, Tourette's syndrome, conversion disorder or other neuromuscular movement disorders. It has been found that the prevalence of dystonia is high in individuals with Huntington's disease, where the most common clinical presentations are internal shoulder rotation, sustained fist clenching, knee flexion, and foot inversion. Risk factors for increased dystonia in patients with Huntington's disease include long disease duration and use of antidopaminergic medication.

Causes
Primary dystonia is suspected when the dystonia is the only sign and there is no identifiable cause or structural abnormality in the central nervous system. Researchers suspect it is caused by a pathology of the central nervous system, likely originating in those parts of the brain concerned with motor function—such as the basal ganglia and the GABA (gamma-aminobutyric acid) producing Purkinje neurons. The precise cause of primary dystonia is unknown. In many cases it may involve some genetic predisposition towards the disorder combined with environmental conditions.

Secondary dystonia refers to dystonia brought on by some identified cause, such as head injury, drug side effect (e.g. tardive dystonia), or neurological disease (e.g. Wilson's disease, stroke).

Meningitis and encephalitis caused by viral, bacterial, and fungal infections of the brain have been associated with dystonia. The main mechanism is inflammation of the blood vessels, causing restriction of blood flow to the basal ganglia. Other mechanisms include direct nerve injury by the organism or a toxin, or autoimmune mechanisms.

Environmental and task-related factors are suspected to trigger the development of focal dystonias because they appear disproportionately in individuals who perform high precision hand movements such as musicians, engineers, architects, and artists. Chlorpromazine can also cause dystonia, which can be often misjudged as a seizure.
Neuroleptic drugs often cause dystonia, including oculogyric crisis.

Malfunction of the sodium-potassium pump may be a factor in some dystonias. The - pump has been shown to control and set the intrinsic activity mode of cerebellar Purkinje neurons. This suggests that the pump might not simply be a homeostatic, "housekeeping" molecule for ionic gradients; but could be a computational element in the cerebellum and the brain. Indeed, an ouabain block of - pumps in the cerebellum of a live mouse results in it displaying ataxia and dystonia. Ataxia is observed for lower ouabain concentrations, dystonia is observed at higher ouabain concentrations. A mutation in the - pump (ATP1A3 gene) can cause rapid onset dystonia parkinsonism. The parkinsonism aspect of this disease may be attributable to malfunctioning - pumps in the basal ganglia; the dystonia aspect may be attributable to malfunctioning - pumps in the cerebellum (that act to corrupt its input to the basal ganglia) possibly in Purkinje neurons.

Cerebellum issues causing dystonia is described by Filip et al. 2013: "Although dystonia has traditionally been regarded as a basal ganglia dysfunction, recent provocative evidence has emerged of cerebellar involvement in the pathophysiology of this enigmatic disease. It has been suggested that the cerebellum plays an important role in dystonia etiology, from neuroanatomical research of complex networks showing that the cerebellum is connected to a wide range of other central nervous system structures involved in movement control to animal models indicating that signs of dystonia are due to cerebellum dysfunction and completely disappear after cerebellectomy, and finally to clinical observations in secondary dystonia patients with various types of cerebellar lesions. It is proposed that dystonia is a large-scale dysfunction, involving not only cortico-basal ganglia-thalamo-cortical pathways, but the cortico-ponto-cerebello-thalamo-cortical loop as well. Even in the absence of traditional "cerebellar signs" in most dystonia patients, there are more subtle indications of cerebellar dysfunction. It is clear that as long as the cerebellum's role in dystonia genesis remains unexamined, it will be difficult to significantly improve the current standards of dystonia treatment or to provide curative treatment."

Treatment
Reducing the types of movements that trigger or worsen dystonic symptoms provides some relief, as does reducing stress, getting plenty of rest, moderate exercise, and relaxation techniques. Various treatments focus on sedating brain functions or blocking nerve communications with the muscles via drugs, neuro-suppression, or selective denervation surgery. Almost all treatments have negative side-effects and risks. A geste antagoniste is a physical gesture or position (such as touching one's chin) that temporarily interrupts dystonia, it is also known as a sensory trick. Patients may be aware of the presence of a geste antagoniste that provides some relief. Therapy for dystonia can involve prosthetics that passively simulate the stimulation.

Physical intervention
While research in the area of effectiveness of physical therapy intervention for dystonia remains weak, there is reason to believe that rehabilitation can benefit dystonia patients. Physical therapy can be utilized to manage changes in balance, mobility and overall function that occur as a result of the disorder. A variety of treatment strategies can be employed to address the unique needs of each individual.  Potential treatment interventions include splinting, therapeutic exercise, manual stretching, soft tissue and joint mobilization, postural training and bracing, neuromuscular electrical stimulation, constraint-induced movement therapy, activity and environmental modification, and gait training.

A patient with dystonia may have significant challenges in activities of daily living (ADL), an area especially suited for treatment by occupational therapy (OT).  An occupational therapist (OT) may perform needed upper extremity splinting, provide movement inhibitory techniques, train fine motor coordination, provide an assistive device, or teach alternative methods of activity performance to achieve a patient's goals for bathing, dressing, toileting, and other valued activities.

Recent research has investigated further into the role of physiotherapy in the treatment of dystonia. A recent study showed that reducing psychological stress, in conjunction with exercise, is beneficial for reducing truncal dystonia in patients with Parkinson’s disease. Another study emphasized progressive relaxation, isometric muscle endurance, dynamic strength, coordination, balance, and body perception, seeing significant improvements to patients' quality of life after 4 weeks.

Since the root of the problem is neurological, doctors have explored sensorimotor retraining activities to enable the brain to "rewire" itself and eliminate dystonic movements. The work of several doctors such as Nancy Byl and Joaquin Farias has shown that sensorimotor retraining activities and proprioceptive stimulation can induce neuroplasticity, making it possible for patients to recover substantial function that was lost due to Cervical Dystonia, hand dystonia, blepharospasm, oromandibular dystonia, dysphonia and musicians' dystonia.

Some focal dystonias have been proven treatable through movement retraining in the Taubman approach, particularly in the case of musicians. However other focal dystonias may not respond and may even be made worse by this treatment.

Due to the rare and variable nature of dystonia, research investigating the effectiveness of these treatments is limited. There is no gold standard for physiotherapy rehabilitation. To date, focal cervical dystonia has received the most research attention; however, study designs are poorly controlled and limited to small sample sizes.

Medication
Different medications are tried in an effort to find a combination that is effective for a specific person. Not all people respond well to the same medications. Medications that have had positive results in some include: anticholinergics (such as diphenhydramine, benzatropine, atropine), dopamine agonists (such as ropinirole and bromocriptine), and muscle relaxants (such as diazepam).

Anticholinergics
Medications such as anticholinergics (benztropine), which act as inhibitors of the neurotransmitter acetylcholine, may provide some relief. In the case of an acute dystonic reaction, diphenhydramine is sometimes used (though this drug is well known as an antihistamine, in this context it is being used primarily for its anticholinergic role).. See also Procyclidine. Another which in many has shown total control of symptoms, alone or taken with other medications,often clonazepam, is gabapentin. Noting, some are generic sensitive, as with other medications, and either have to sample test each one for a successful result, or take the original version.

Baclofen
A baclofen pump has been used to treat patients of all ages exhibiting muscle spasticity along with dystonia. The pump delivers baclofen via a catheter to the thecal space surrounding the spinal cord. The pump itself is placed in the abdomen. It can be refilled periodically by access through the skin.  Baclofen can also be taken in tablet form

Botulinum toxin injection
Botulinum toxin injections into affected muscles have proved quite successful in providing some relief for around 3–6 months, depending on the kind of dystonia. Botox or Dysport injections have the advantage of ready availability (the same form is used for cosmetic surgery) and the effects are not permanent. There is a risk of temporary paralysis of the muscles being injected or the leaking of the toxin into adjacent muscle groups, causing weakness or paralysis in them. The injections must be repeated, as the effects wear off and around 15% of recipients develop immunity to the toxin. There is a Type A and a Type B toxin approved for treatment of dystonia; often, those that develop resistance to Type A may be able to use Type B.
Muscle relaxants
Clonazepam, a benzodiazepine, is also sometimes prescribed. However, for most, their effects are limited and side-effects like mental confusion, sedation, mood swings, and short-term memory loss occur.

Parkinsonian drugs
Dopamine agonists: One type of dystonia, dopamine-responsive dystonia, can be completely treated with regular doses of L-DOPA in a form such as Sinemet (carbidopa/levodopa). Although this does not remove the condition, it does alleviate the symptoms most of the time. (In contrast, dopamine antagonists can sometimes cause dystonia.)

Ketogenic diet

One complex case study found that a ketogenic type diet may have been helpful in reducing symptoms associated with alternating hemiplegia of childhood (AHC) of a young child. However, as the researchers noted, their results could have been corollary in nature and not due to the diet itself, though future research is warranted.

Surgery

Surgery, such as the denervation of selected muscles, may also provide some relief; however, the destruction of nerves in the limbs or brain is not reversible and should be considered only in the most extreme cases. Recently, the procedure of deep brain stimulation (DBS) has proven successful in a number of cases of severe generalised dystonia. DBS as treatment for medication-refractory dystonia, on the other hand, may increase the risk of suicide in patients. However, reference data of patients without DBS therapy are lacking.

History

The Italian Bernardino Ramazzini provided one of the first descriptions of task-specific dystonia in 1713 in a book of occupational diseases, The Morbis Artificum.
In chapter II of this book's Supplementum, Ramazzini noted that "Scribes and Notaries" may develop "incessant movement of the hand, always in the same direction … the continuous and almost tonic strain on the muscles... that results in failure of power in the right hand". A report from the British Civil Service also contained an early description of writer's cramp. In 1864, Solly coined the term "scrivener’s palsy" for this condition. These historical reports usually attributed the etiology of the motor abnormalities to overuse. Then, dystonia were reported in detail in 1911, when Hermann Oppenheim, Edward Flatau and Wladyslaw Sterling described some Jewish children affected by a syndrome that was retrospectively considered to represent familial cases of DYT1 dystonia. Some decades later, in 1975, the first international conference on dystonia was held in New York. It was then recognized that, in addition to severe generalized forms, the dystonia phenotype also encompasses poorly-progressive focal and segmental cases with onset in adulthood, such as blepharospasm, torticollis and writer's cramp.
These forms were previously considered independent disorders and were mainly classified among neuroses. A modern definition of dystonia was worded some years later, in 1984. During the following years it became evident that dystonia syndromes are numerous and diversified, new terminological descriptors (e.g., dystonia plus, heredodegenerative dystonias, etc.) and additional classification schemes were introduced. The clinical complexity of dystonia was then fully recognized.

See also 

 Extrapyramidal symptoms
 Hypertonia
 Sydenham's chorea
 Ulegyria (brain condition with dystonia symptoms)

References

External links 
 A Boston Marathon record is about to be set – by a man with a movement disorder in The Washington Post
 GeneReview/NIH/UW entry on Dystonia Overview
 GeneReviews/NCBI/NIH/UW entry on Early-Onset Primary Dystonia
 Film on Dystonia from Public Broadcasting Service
 A story of one woman's struggle with dystonia at MSNBC.com

 
Extrapyramidal and movement disorders
Adverse effects of psychoactive drugs
Articles containing video clips